Stomis is a genus of woodland ground beetles in the family Carabidae. There are more than 40 described species in Stomis.

Species
These 42 species belong to the genus Stomis:

 Stomis benesi Dvorak, 2006
 Stomis benoiti Jeannel, 1953
 Stomis brivioi Sciaky, 1998
 Stomis bucciarellii Pesarini, 1979
 Stomis cavazzutii Lassalle, 2003
 Stomis chinensis Jedlicka, 1932
 Stomis collucens (Fairmaire, 1889)
 Stomis danielanus Semenov, 1904
 Stomis deuvei Marcilhac, 1993
 Stomis eggeri Monzini, 2016
 Stomis elegans Oustalet, 1874
 Stomis elongatus Tian & Pan, 2004
 Stomis exilis Sciaky & Wrase, 1997
 Stomis facchinii Sciaky, 1998
 Stomis fallettii Facchini, 2003
 Stomis farkaci Sciaky, 1998
 Stomis formosus Semenov, 1889
 Stomis gigas Sciaky, 1998
 Stomis granulatus Say, 1830
 Stomis habashanensis Lassalle, 2007
 Stomis hyrcanus Tschitscherine, 1904
 Stomis jelineki Lassalle, 2003
 Stomis ludmilae Dvorak, 2001
 Stomis miyakei Morita, 2010
 Stomis ovipennis Chaudoir, 1846
 Stomis philospelaeus Monzini, 2018
 Stomis politus Ledoux & Roux, 1995
 Stomis prognathus Bates, 1883
 Stomis pumicatus (Panzer, 1795)
 Stomis robustus Sciaky, 1998
 Stomis roccai Schatzmayr, 1925
 Stomis romani Dvorak, 2001
 Stomis rostratus (Duftschmid, 1812)
 Stomis schoenmanni Sciaky, 1998
 Stomis sehnali Lassalle, 2007
 Stomis stefanii Deuve, 2006
 Stomis taibashanensis Lassalle, 2003
 Stomis termitiformis (Van Dyke, 1926)
 Stomis titanus Sciaky, 1998
 Stomis tschitscherini Semenov, 1904
 Stomis vignai Sciaky, 1998
 Stomis zaonus Habu, 1954

References

 
Pterostichinae